English musician Birdy has released four studio albums, four extended plays, seven singles and six music videos in MP3 format. She began her career at the age of 12 when she won the Open Mic UK music competition, singing "So Be Free", a song she composed herself. The competition brought Birdy to the attention of 14th Floor Records, which signed her in 2008.

Birdy released her self-titled debut studio album in November 2011, which consists of cover versions and two original songs. The album reached number one on the Australian, Belgian and Dutch album charts. It was certified triple platinum by the Syndicat National de l'Édition Phonographique (SNEP), platinum by the Belgian Entertainment Association (BEA) and gold by the British Phonographic Industry (BPI). Four singles were released from the album: "Skinny Love", "Shelter", "People Help the People" and "1901", with "Skinny Love" peaking at number one in the Netherlands and number two in Australia.

Birdy's second studio Fire Within was released in September 2013. It peaked at number five in Australia and number eight in the UK. Four singles, "Wings", "No Angel", "Light Me Up" and "Words As Weapons" were released from the album. In March 2016 she released Beautiful Lies, her third album, and reached the top five in Hungary, Ireland, and the UK. It was preceded by the singles "Keeping Your Head Up" and "Wild Horses", taken from the album. Her fourth studio album, Young Heart, was released in April 2021.

Studio albums

Extended plays

Singles

As lead artist

As featured artist

Promotional singles

Other charted and certified songs

Guest appearances

Music videos

Notes

References

External links
 
 

Alternative rock discographies
Discographies of British artists
Folk music discographies